Russula violeipes, commonly known as the velvet brittlegill, is a species of fungus in the family Russulaceae. It was described by French mycologist Lucien Quélet in 1898. An edible mushroom, it is found in Asia and Europe.

References

External links

violeipes
Edible fungi
Fungi described in 1898
Fungi of Asia
Fungi of Europe